A sports magazine is usually a weekly, biweekly or monthly,  magazine featuring articles or segments on sports. Some may be published a specific number of times per year.  A wide range of sports are covered by these magazines which include general, auto racing, baseball, basketball, bicycling, body building, bowling, boxing, football, football "soccer", golf, gymnastics, karate, lacrosse, polo, skating, skiing, swimming, surfing, tennis, and wrestling.

History

Sports journalism started covering sporting events in the United States in the 1800s in newspaper and magazine format.  The Sporting News being the oldest, and was first published March 17, 1886.  Sports Illustrated (SI) originated in 1954, originally lead by Henry Luce and later André Laguerre, is one of the leading sports magazines in the United States.  SI allowed "people to read more about what they had seen on television or read about in the newspaper".

In Print

Sports magazines in print include:

Former Magazines

There are several former sports magazine. Some of these include:
 
American Field, Baily's Monthly Magazine of Sports and Pastimes, and Racing Register,  Outing (magazine),  Public Ledger, and The Athletic World (Canada)

See also
 L'Equipe
 La Gazzetta dello Sport
 Marca
 Diario AS
 Mundo Deportivo
 Sport
 How Big is a Pool Table in 2022
  Paper Past:  List of sports magazines
 Top 25 List of Magazines in 2020

References

 
Magazine genres